Munmohan Singh "Moe" Sihota (born February 18, 1955) is a Canadian former broadcaster and politician. He was the first Canadian of South Asian descent to be elected to provincial parliament.

He was born in Duncan, British Columbia and attended St. George's Boys School, Vancouver, on scholarship. He earned a bachelor's degree in social work from the University of British Columbia in 1977, was awarded a scholarship to Warwick School of Economics, London, 1981 and a law degree from the University of Victoria in 1982. He was a social worker in White Rock in 1978-9 and a lawyer in Esquimalt in 1984.

Political career

His political career began during his undergraduate years at the University of British Columbia serving as the Ombudsman for the UBC student society, the Alma Mater Society, as well as serving as an elected student representative on the UBC Board of Governors. He became President of the Young New Democrats in 1978 and also served as the President of Cowichan—Malahat—The Islands Federal NDP as well as being the campaign manager for Frank Mitchell and Jim Manly who were elected to the British Columbia Legislature and the House of Commons of Canada respectively. In 1984, Sihota was elected as an Alderman for Esquimalt.

In 1986, Sihota ran as the NDP Candidate in the riding of Esquimalt-Port Renfrew to replace the retiring Frank Mitchell. He held the seat easily and became the first Indo-Canadian to be elected to any federal or provincial riding.

In 1991, Sihota ran for and won re-election in the new riding of Esquimalt-Metchosin as part of an NDP landslide victory. Subsequently, he was named by Premier Mike Harcourt in his first cabinet, the Minister of Labour and Consumer Services as well as Minister Responsible for Constitutional Affairs, becoming the first Indian-Canadian cabinet minister in a province of Canada.

He continued to serve in several cabinet posts under the Harcourt New Democratic government as well as under the subsequent governments of Glen Clark and Dan Miller, but was forced to resign from cabinet several times.

During his career, he created 200 new Provincial Parks, extended Workers Compensation Coverage to farmworkers and changed BC logging practices. He also served on the Board of Directors of BC Hydro and Power Authority, Insurance Corporation of BC, Workers Compensation Board and the BC Buildings Corporation.

Controversy

BC Law Society misconduct
Sihota resigned as Minister of Labour in 1995 after the Law Society of BC suspended his licence to practice for 18 months, due to finding him guilty of professional misconduct. He was reinstated to Cabinet in 1996, but resigned again December of the same year due to new allegations of corruption, abuse of office, and conflict of interest.  The new allegations were due to actions he performed while in office that benefited his friend and former Vancouver MP Herb Dhaliwal. In his memoirs, "A Measure of Defiance", former BC Premier Mike Harcourt commented that "Although the B.C. Law Society denied the allegation, the hint that the investigation of our outspoken environment minister was politically motivated was too strong to be dismissed that quickly. This was, after all, British Columbia, the heart of nasty, partisan politics. There was no public outcry over the incident and to most of his constituents, reporters and even political adversaries, Moe's credibility did not suffer seriously.

BC Hydro appointment
In 1991 Sihota helped his friend Dhaliwal become appointed to the board of B.C. Hydro in 1991, after Dhaliwal provided Sihota with a substantial mortgage guarantee.  The opposition BC Liberals then requested an investigation by Conflict Commissioner Ted Hughes. Hughes later found that Sihota had not been in a conflict of interest. However, Hughes also said at the time of the finding that had the new laws been in place during Dhaliwal's appointment in 1991, Sihota would have been found to be in a conflict of interest.

Limousine licences
In 1996 Dhaliwal had applied to the Motor Carrier Commission for several licences related to a limousine company partly owned by Dhaliwal and run by Sihota's cousin.  It was later revealed by the former Commission chairman that Sihota had made repeated calls and wrote several letters to the commission in relation to Dhaliwal's applications.  Sihota again resigned from cabinet in 1996.  A new investigation was started not by the Conflict of Interest Commissioner, but by fellow NDP party member and Glen Clark deputy minister Doug McArthur.  Although McArthur found that Sihota had "exercised poor judgment and bullied commission staff", he found that Sihota had not been in a conflict of interest. Glen Clark then reappointed Sihota back to cabinet in 1998.

Post Glen Clark era
After retiring from politics following the NDP's defeat in the, 2001 provincial election, Sihota became a television host for The New VI (formerly A-Channel now CTV2) in Victoria. He left the station in 2004 when his phone-in show, VILand Voices, was cancelled due to re-organization. He currently provides political commentary for CBC Radio's Early Edition Political Panel.

Since 2004, Sihota has pursued several business opportunities and is currently a part-owner and director of the Northern Bear Golf Club (Edmonton, AB), Four Points Sheraton (Victoria, BC) and Walton's Lakefront Resort (Osoyoos, BC).

In 2012, Vancouver Magazine named Sihota as one B.C's 50 most influential citizens

In 2015, Sihota received the Queen's Diamond Jubilee Medal for contributions to Canadian Society.

In 2005, the Parvasi Awards were created to honour outstanding achievements by Canadian Punjabis. Mr. Sihota was the recipient of the 2015 Lifetime Achievement Award in recognition of being the first Indo Canadian elected to a Canadian Legislature and the first Indo Canadian ever to be appointed to a Cabinet.

The 100 Year Journey Project chronicles the stories of the first 100 South Asians that impacted Canadian Society, chartered new territories and broke new ground. Mr.Sihota received the 2015 Pioneers and Navigators Award for his work in Politics and Public Policy.

After the election of the New Democratic Government in Alberta, Mr.Sihota joined Edmonton's Canadian Strategy Group to provide political and policy advice to Alberta Corporations, Trade Unions and non -profits.

BC NDP president
In November 2009, Sihota was elected to the position of President of the BC New Democratic Party. In October 2010, the media revealed that Sihota was being paid a salary for his position as President, with payments from The Canadian Union of Public Employees, United Steelworkers, and the BC Federation of Labour . Sihota was elected to a second term at the 2011 party convention.

Sihota, along with party leader Adrian Dix, faced criticism for running a poor campaign following the NDP's unexpected defeat in the 2013 provincial election. On September 21, 2013, the day after Dix announced his intention to step down as leader, Sihota announced that he would be stepping down as party president at the end of his term in November 2013. He was credited with modernizing the NDP's fundraising capacity and implementing an outreach to the business community during his term.

Personal life
Sihota currently lives in Victoria, British Columbia and is married with two children, Rajan and Karina. Karina works for the Canadian Labour Congress and Rajan works in digital marketing for rock bands.

References

External links
 Moe Sihota

1955 births
Living people
British Columbia municipal councillors
British Columbia New Democratic Party MLAs
Canadian campaign managers
Canadian political party presidents
Canadian politicians of Indian descent
Canadian social workers
Canadian Sikhs
Canadian television hosts
Lawyers in British Columbia
Members of the Executive Council of British Columbia
People from Duncan, British Columbia
People from Esquimalt, British Columbia
University of British Columbia School of Social Work alumni
University of Victoria Faculty of Law alumni
20th-century Canadian politicians